Houdina Radio Control Co. was a radio equipment firm that was founded by Francis P Houdina, an electrical engineer in the U.S. Army. Francis P Houdina was a fictitious name created by one of two young men from Kaukauna Wisc that built the Radio driven Chandler from Achen motor Co . They also created the false representation of being in the Army.

Radio-operated automobile

Francis P Houdina developed a radio-operated automobile.  He equipped a 1926 Chandler with a transmitting antenna on the tonneau and operated from a second car that followed it with a transmitter. The radio signals operated small electric motors that directed every movement of the car.  In 1925, he publicly demonstrated his radio-controlled driver-less car American Wonder in New York City streets, traveling up Broadway and down Fifth Avenue through thick traffic.

Achen Motor, a distributor of cars in Milwaukee and surrounding territory, used Houdina's invention under the name Phantom Auto and demonstrated it in December 1926 in the streets of Milwaukee. It was demonstrated again in June 1932 in Fredericksburg as a feature attraction of Bigger Bargain Day in which most of the merchants of the city were participating.

Houdini's altercation

In July 1925, Harry Houdini and his secretary, Oscar Teale, visited the offices of Houdina Radio Control and an argument broke out. Houdini damaged the furniture and an electric chandelier, accusing the company of using his name unlawfully—ironic, indeed, since Houdini himself "borrowed" that name from the famed French magician, Jean Eugène Robert-Houdin. Afterwards, Francis P Houdina said that there had never been any intention on his part to capitalize on the name of Houdini. A summons for disorderly conduct was issued against Houdini but the charges were dropped because George Young the manager failed to appear in court.

See also
Autonomous car
Unmanned ground vehicle
Radio control

References

Self-driving car companies
Automotive technologies
Harry Houdini
Unmanned ground vehicles